Mie cakalang is a traditional Indonesian skipjack tuna noodle soup from Manado, North Sulawesi, Indonesia. Mie means "noodle", while cakalang is Manado dialect for "skipjack tuna".

The noodle soup is noted for its savoury cakalang fish aroma. Its ingredients includes yellow noodle, skipjack tuna, choy sum, cabbages, chili pepper, scallion, shallot and garlic.

See also

 Mie celor
 Mie Aceh
 Mie goreng
 Mie kocok
 Cakalang fufu

References

External links
 Mie Cakalang recipes 
 Video about Mie Cakalang

Indonesian seafood dishes
Indonesian noodle dishes
Manado cuisine